Yuhui District is a district of the city of Bengbu, Anhui Province, China.

Administrative divisions
Nowadays, Yuhui District is divided to 5 subdistricts, 1 town and 1 township.
5 Subdistricts

1 Town
 Qinji

1 Township
 Changqing

References

Bengbu